Mount Hotham is a mountain located in the Victorian Alps of the Great Dividing Range, in the Australian state of Victoria. The nearest major road to the mountain is the Great Alpine Road. The mountain is named after Charles Hotham, Governor of Victoria from 1854 to 1855.

Mount Hotham's summit rises to an altitude of  

Mount Hotham Alpine Resort, a commercial alpine resort, is located on the slopes of Mount Hotham summit and nearby mountains.

Administratively, the mountain is within Mount Hotham Alpine Resort unincorporated area, land which is managed by Alpine Resorts Victoria. This unincorporated area is surrounded by Alpine Shire.

Climate
As with most of the Australian Alps, Mount Hotham's climate is, compared to the bulk of Australia, cold throughout the year; with particularly cold maximum temperatures, and Mount Hotham is one of very few areas in Australia that frequently records maximum temperatures below freezing. Mount Hotham is also one of the only places in Australia to have never recorded a temperature above ; during the early 2009 southeastern Australia heat wave, whilst most of the state sweltered above , the mountain's peak temperature was a mild . 

Snowfall occurs frequently and heavily, and sub-freezing maximum temperatures can be recorded throughout the year—even in high summer; however, due to frequent winter cloud and the mountain's exposed position, a temperature below  has only once-occurred since records began in 1990. Mount Hotham receives an average of 66.1 snowy days annually. It is the coldest weather station on mainland Australia by maximum temperatures.

Owing to its short, cool summers and long, cold winters, Mount Hotham yields a Subpolar oceanic climate (Cfc) bordering on Tundra (ET).

Visiting in winter 
During the declared snow season (usually from the Queen's Birthday long weekend in June till the first weekend in October), it is a legal requirement to carry diamond pattern wheel chains and fit them if directed. There are penalties for not doing so. The steep and exposed portions of the Great Alpine Road between Harrietville and Hotham Heights means that in some conditions, vehicles (particularly two wheel drive vehicles) are not able to travel safely without these wheel chains.

Visitors also need to purchase a Resort Entry permit to enter the resort during winter. The resort entry fee contributes to essential services for guests around the mountain, including ski patrol, the free village buses, snow clearing of car parks in the village, waste management and environmental initiatives.

Gallery

See also

Alpine National Park
List of mountains in Victoria

References

External links
 Mt Hotham official website

Mountains of Victoria (Australia)
Victorian Alps
Unincorporated areas of Victoria (Australia)